Bungaree is a town in Victoria, Australia.

Bungaree Post Office opened on 1 August 1863. The town is home to the Bungaree Demons, who play in the Central Highlands Football Netball League.

References

See also

 Bungaree railway station, Victoria

Towns in Victoria (Australia)